Kinley is a given name.

People
Kinley Dorji, Bhutanese journalist and politician
Kinley Dorji (footballer), Bhutanese footballer
Kinley Dowling, Canadian musician
Kinley Gibson, Canadian road bicycle racer
Kinley McNicoll, Canadian soccer player
Kinley Wangchuk (footballer), Bhutanese footballer
Kinley Wangchuk (politician), Bhutanese politician